DEMOS (acronym of Demokratski savez, ; , ДЕМОС) is a centrist to centre-right political party in Montenegro. Party founder and current leader is Miodrag Lekić, who is also serving as the party's single MP in the Parliament of Montenegro.

History
Party was founded in 2015 when Miodrag Lekić, leader of the opposition Democratic Front, split from the alliance due to disagreements with its constituent parties, and formed the new moderate right political subject.

In September 2016, DEMOS decided to enter the Key Coalition with URA and SNP in order to participate at the forthcoming parliamentary election, winning four parliamentary seats. In the summer of 2017 a rift occurred within the party, which resulted in a split, with a conservative faction led by Goran Danilović and Goran Radonjić deciding to form a new party, called United Montenegro. The split left Demos with two MPs, as the remaining two defected to the new party.

In July 2020, Demos decided to enter the big tent Peace is Our Nation coalition with Democratic Montenegro, as well some minor parties and independent candidates, in order to participate in the August 2020 elections.

Elections

Parliamentary elections

 Opposition (2015—2016); Provisional government (2016)

Presidential elections

References

2015 establishments in Montenegro
Conservative parties in Montenegro
Liberal parties in Montenegro
Montenegro–European Union relations
Political parties established in 2015
Pro-European political parties in Montenegro